Aquaspirillum putridiconchylium is a species of Aquaspirillum that has a unique spiral rod. It is grown best in 25-30 degrees Celsius. Cultures are usually found in pond water.

References

External links
Type strain of Aquaspirillum putridiconchylium at BacDive -  the Bacterial Diversity Metadatabase

Neisseriales
Bacteria described in 1961